Flesh Feast (released in 1970, though shot in 1967) is an American horror film that features Veronica Lake in her final screen performance.

Plot
Dr. Elaine Frederick, a mad scientist, is working on developing maggots that prefer human flesh, while her services are used to make a clone of Adolf Hitler. She cooperates with the plan to resurrect Hitler as a way of exacting revenge for the death of her mother, a political prisoner executed in Ravensbrück concentration camp. While convincing everyone the flesh-eating maggots are for regeneration research, she simply wants to throw them in the resurrected Hitler's face, which she does.

Cast
Veronica Lake - Dr. Elaine Frederick
Phil Philbin - Ed Casey
Heather Hughes - Kristine
Martha Mischon - Virginia Day
Yanka Mann - Miss Powell
Dianne Wilhite - Nurse
Chris Martell - Max Bauer

References

External links

 
 

1970 films
1970 horror films
1970 directorial debut films
Mad scientist films
Cultural depictions of Adolf Hitler
1970s English-language films
American horror films
Films about insects
1970s American films